The 1956 United States presidential election in North Dakota took place on November 6, 1956, as part of the 1956 United States presidential election. Voters chose four representatives, or electors, to the Electoral College, who voted for president and vice president.

North Dakota was won by incumbent President Dwight D. Eisenhower (R–Pennsylvania), running with Vice President Richard Nixon, with 61.72% of the popular vote, against Adlai Stevenson (D–Illinois), running with Tennessee Senator Estes Kefauver, with 38.09% of the popular vote.

Results

Results by county

See also
 United States presidential elections in North Dakota

Notes

References

North Dakota
1956
1956 North Dakota elections